Trading Spouses: Meet Your New Mommy, or Trading Spouses, is an American reality show in which two families, usually of different social classes, swap wives or husbands for a week. Each family is awarded $50,000, with the stipulation that the guest mother decides how her host family must spend the money. The title of the show is a play on the idiom Trading Spaces.

The show shares a very similar format to Wife Swap (and its U.S. remake). In 2004, ABC showcased their upcoming Wife Swap show including projections of its popularity. Weeks before the show's debut, Fox introduced Trading Spouses: Meet Your New Mommy. The producers of Wife Swap, RDF Media, claimed Fox stole their concept, while Fox argued that TV shows have always borrowed from one another and that Fox simply beat ABC to delivery.

The show completed airing its third season on May 3, 2007. On February 27, 2008, Fox announced that it had sold the rights to Trading Spouses: Meet Your New Mommy to CMT, effectively ending the series.

In 2005, Trading Spouses was one of several television programs cited in a class-action lawsuit filed by the Writers Guild of America concerning labor law violations.

References

External links
 at CMT.com

Fox Broadcasting Company original programming
American television series based on British television series
2000s American reality television series
2004 American television series debuts
2007 American television series endings
American dating and relationship reality television series
CMT (American TV channel) original programming
English-language television shows
Television series by Rocket Science Laboratories